David Park McAllester (6 August 1916 – 30 April 2006) was an American ethnomusicologist and Professor of Anthropology and Music at Wesleyan University, where he taught from 1947–1986. He contributed to the development of the field of ethnomusicology through his studies of Navajo and Comanche musics, and he helped to establish the ethnomusicology department and the World Music Program at Wesleyan. His recordings of Navajo and Comanche music led to the establishment of the World Music Archives at the University.

Biography
He was born on 6 August 1916 in Everett, Massachusetts.

He graduated from Harvard College in 1938 and entered the Juilliard School. However, he was doing anthropological field work during the summers at the same time and in 1940 decided not to pursue a career in music, instead enrolling in a Ph.D. program in anthropology at Columbia University.

While in Manhattan, New York City, he joined the Religious Society of Friends (Quakers), and remained a member for his entire life.

In the Second World War, as a conscientious objector, he applied for and received exemption from military draft, and worked with the Civilian Public Service.

After the war, he returned to Columbia. He accepted a teaching position at Wesleyan University in Connecticut in 1947, while still working on his degree. He was awarded the Ph.D. in 1950.

Along with Alan Merriam, Willard Rhodes, and Charles Seeger, he founded the Society for Ethnomusicology in 1955.

He specialized in Native American music, and did field work on the Navajo reservation for many years in the summer.

He partially retired in 1979 and retired fully in 1986 to a home in the Berkshires. He died on 30 April 2006 in Monterey, Massachusetts.

External links 
 Guide to the David McAllester Papers, 1940 - 1996
 David McAllester
 Behind the Scenes of the Ethnomusicology Dept., by Justin Pottle, September 22, 2009

References 

American ethnomusicologists
1916 births
2006 deaths
Harvard College alumni
Columbia Graduate School of Arts and Sciences alumni
Wesleyan University faculty
American conscientious objectors
Members of the Civilian Public Service
Juilliard School alumni
20th-century American musicologists